Càstor Oswaldo Azuaje Pérez (19 October 1951 – 8 January 2021) was a Venezuelan Catholic bishop.

Biography
He was born in Venezuela and was ordained to the priesthood in 1975. He served as titular bishop of Vertara and as auxiliary bishop of the Archdiocese of Maracaibo, Venezuela, from 2007 to 2012. He then served as bishop of the Diocese of Trujillo, from 2012 until his death in 2021.

Azuaje Pérez died from COVID-19 in Valera, Trujillo, on 8 January 2021, at the age of 69, during the COVID-19 pandemic in Venezuela.

Notes

1951 births
2021 deaths
21st-century Roman Catholic bishops in Venezuela
21st-century Roman Catholic titular bishops
Deaths from the COVID-19 pandemic in Venezuela
Roman Catholic bishops of Trujillo, Venezuela
Roman Catholic bishops of Maracaibo